The Blagoveshchensk constituency (No.4) is a Russian legislative constituency in Bashkortostan. The constituency covers parts of Ufa and northern Bashkiria.

Members elected

Election results

1993

|-
! colspan=2 style="background-color:#E9E9E9;text-align:left;vertical-align:top;" |Candidate
! style="background-color:#E9E9E9;text-align:left;vertical-align:top;" |Party
! style="background-color:#E9E9E9;text-align:right;" |Votes
! style="background-color:#E9E9E9;text-align:right;" |%
|-
|style="background-color:"|
|align=left|Ramil Mirsayev
|align=left|Independent
|
|37.53%
|-
|style="background-color:"|
|align=left|Robert Akhiyarov
|align=left|Independent
| -
|11.53%
|-
| colspan="5" style="background-color:#E9E9E9;"|
|- style="font-weight:bold"
| colspan="3" style="text-align:left;" | Total
| 
| 100%
|-
| colspan="5" style="background-color:#E9E9E9;"|
|- style="font-weight:bold"
| colspan="4" |Source:
|
|}

1995

|-
! colspan=2 style="background-color:#E9E9E9;text-align:left;vertical-align:top;" |Candidate
! style="background-color:#E9E9E9;text-align:left;vertical-align:top;" |Party
! style="background-color:#E9E9E9;text-align:right;" |Votes
! style="background-color:#E9E9E9;text-align:right;" |%
|-
|style="background-color:"|
|align=left|Alzam Saifullin
|align=left|Agrarian Party
|
|47.12%
|-
|style="background-color:"|
|align=left|Nur Salikhov
|align=left|Independent
|
|27.87%
|-
|style="background-color:"|
|align=left|Eduard Khusnutdinov
|align=left|Independent
|
|12.33%
|-
|style="background-color:"|
|align=left|Viktor Vishnyakov
|align=left|Liberal Democratic Party
|
|5.88%
|-
|style="background-color:#000000"|
|colspan=2 |against all
|
|5.01%
|-
| colspan="5" style="background-color:#E9E9E9;"|
|- style="font-weight:bold"
| colspan="3" style="text-align:left;" | Total
| 
| 100%
|-
| colspan="5" style="background-color:#E9E9E9;"|
|- style="font-weight:bold"
| colspan="4" |Source:
|
|}

1998

|-
! colspan=2 style="background-color:#E9E9E9;text-align:left;vertical-align:top;" |Candidate
! style="background-color:#E9E9E9;text-align:left;vertical-align:top;" |Party
! style="background-color:#E9E9E9;text-align:right;" |Votes
! style="background-color:#E9E9E9;text-align:right;" |%
|-
|style="background-color:"|
|align=left|Vladimir Protopopov
|align=left|Our Home – Russia
|
|44.76%
|-
|style="background-color:"|
|align=left|Fargat Khabibullin
|align=left|Independent
|
|22.86%
|-
|style="background-color:"|
|align=left|Rafis Kadyrov
|align=left|Independent
|
|7.83%
|-
|style="background-color:"|
|align=left|Yury Sadykov
|align=left|Independent
|
|6.32%
|-
|style="background-color:"|
|align=left|Flyus Khabibullin
|align=left|Independent
|
|2.40%
|-
|style="background-color:"|
|align=left|Firat Valeyev
|align=left|Independent
|
|2.01%
|-
|style="background-color:"|
|align=left|Yury Ostanin
|align=left|Independent
|
|2.01%
|-
|style="background-color:"|
|align=left|Rim Niyazgulov
|align=left|Independent
|
|1.58%
|-
|style="background-color:"|
|align=left|Anver Yumagulov
|align=left|Independent
|
|1.34%
|-
|style="background-color:#000000"|
|colspan=2 |against all
|
|4.55%
|-
| colspan="5" style="background-color:#E9E9E9;"|
|- style="font-weight:bold"
| colspan="3" style="text-align:left;" | Total
| 
| 100%
|-
| colspan="5" style="background-color:#E9E9E9;"|
|- style="font-weight:bold"
| colspan="4" |Source:
|
|}

1999

|-
! colspan=2 style="background-color:#E9E9E9;text-align:left;vertical-align:top;" |Candidate
! style="background-color:#E9E9E9;text-align:left;vertical-align:top;" |Party
! style="background-color:#E9E9E9;text-align:right;" |Votes
! style="background-color:#E9E9E9;text-align:right;" |%
|-
|style="background-color:#3B9EDF"|
|align=left|Ragib Gimayev
|align=left|Fatherland – All Russia
|
|51.33%
|-
|style="background-color:"|
|align=left|Vera Seksyayeva
|align=left|Communist Party
|
|19.62%
|-
|style="background-color:"|
|align=left|Farit Valeyev (Uzille)
|align=left|Yabloko
|
|6.99%
|-
|style="background-color:"|
|align=left|Pyotr Iltimirov
|align=left|Independent
|
|4.95%
|-
|style="background-color:"|
|align=left|Ural Fatikhov
|align=left|Independent
|
|4.10%
|-
|style="background-color:"|
|align=left|Irek Ishbuldin
|align=left|Independent
|
|3.55%
|-
|style="background-color:#000000"|
|colspan=2 |against all
|
|7.49%
|-
| colspan="5" style="background-color:#E9E9E9;"|
|- style="font-weight:bold"
| colspan="3" style="text-align:left;" | Total
| 
| 100%
|-
| colspan="5" style="background-color:#E9E9E9;"|
|- style="font-weight:bold"
| colspan="4" |Source:
|
|}

2003

|-
! colspan=2 style="background-color:#E9E9E9;text-align:left;vertical-align:top;" |Candidate
! style="background-color:#E9E9E9;text-align:left;vertical-align:top;" |Party
! style="background-color:#E9E9E9;text-align:right;" |Votes
! style="background-color:#E9E9E9;text-align:right;" |%
|-
|style="background-color:"|
|align=left|Aleksandr Furman
|align=left|United Russia
|
|39.81%
|-
|style="background-color:"|
|align=left|Vyacheslav Kvyat
|align=left|Independent
|
|18.70%
|-
|style="background-color:"|
|align=left|Vera Seksyayeva
|align=left|Communist Party
|
|8.05%
|-
|style="background-color:"|
|align=left|Rafis Zarifyanov
|align=left|Liberal Democratic Party
|
|4.19%
|-
|style="background-color:"|
|align=left|Rafail Dzhalilov
|align=left|Independent
|
|3.94%
|-
|style="background-color:"|
|align=left|Irek Ishbuldin
|align=left|Independent
|
|3.64%
|-
|style="background-color:#164C8C"|
|align=left|Darya Bogdanova
|align=left|United Russian Party Rus'
|
|3.38%
|-
|style="background-color:"|
|align=left|Pavel Dikov
|align=left|Rodina
|
|3.37%
|-
|style="background-color:"|
|align=left|Mikhail Generalov
|align=left|Independent
|
|1.59%
|-
|style="background-color:#000000"|
|colspan=2 |against all
|
|8.15%
|-
| colspan="5" style="background-color:#E9E9E9;"|
|- style="font-weight:bold"
| colspan="3" style="text-align:left;" | Total
| 
| 100%
|-
| colspan="5" style="background-color:#E9E9E9;"|
|- style="font-weight:bold"
| colspan="4" |Source:
|
|}

2016

|-
! colspan=2 style="background-color:#E9E9E9;text-align:left;vertical-align:top;" |Candidate
! style="background-color:#E9E9E9;text-align:leftt;vertical-align:top;" |Party
! style="background-color:#E9E9E9;text-align:right;" |Votes
! style="background-color:#E9E9E9;text-align:right;" |%
|-
| style="background-color: " |
|align=left|Ildar Bikbayev
|align=left|United Russia
|
|50.55%
|-
|style="background-color:"|
|align=left|Vyacheslav Ryabov
|align=left|Liberal Democratic Party
|
|15.46%
|-
|style="background-color:"|
|align=left|Rustam Khafizov
|align=left|Communist Party
|
|9.83%
|-
|style="background-color:"|
|align=left|Valiakhmet Badretdinov
|align=left|A Just Russia
|
|7.28%
|-
|style="background-color:"|
|align=left|Rafis Kadyrov
|align=left|Rodina
|
|7.16%
|-
|style="background-color:"|
|align=left|Oleg Likhachev
|align=left|Communists of Russia
|
|4.33%
|-
|style="background-color:"|
|align=left|Alla Kuzmina
|align=left|Party of Growth
|
|3.73%
|-
| colspan="5" style="background-color:#E9E9E9;"|
|- style="font-weight:bold"
| colspan="3" style="text-align:left;" | Total
| 
| 100%
|-
| colspan="5" style="background-color:#E9E9E9;"|
|- style="font-weight:bold"
| colspan="4" |Source:
|
|}

2021

|-
! colspan=2 style="background-color:#E9E9E9;text-align:left;vertical-align:top;" |Candidate
! style="background-color:#E9E9E9;text-align:left;vertical-align:top;" |Party
! style="background-color:#E9E9E9;text-align:right;" |Votes
! style="background-color:#E9E9E9;text-align:right;" |%
|-
|style="background-color: " |
|align=left|Rafael Mardanshin
|align=left|United Russia
|
|64.11%
|-
|style="background-color:"|
|align=left|Yevgeny Romanchikov
|align=left|Communist Party
|
|13.43%
|-
|style="background-color:"|
|align=left|Aleksey Nilov
|align=left|A Just Russia — For Truth
|
|5.90%
|-
|style="background-color:"|
|align=left|Dmitry Ivanov
|align=left|Liberal Democratic Party
|
|4.73%
|-
|style="background-color: "|
|align=left|Ramil Biktimirov
|align=left|Party of Pensioners
|
|3.39%
|-
|style="background-color:"|
|align=left|Anton Belonogov
|align=left|New People
|
|2.89%
|-
|style="background-color:"|
|align=left|Zulfia Bagautdinova
|align=left|The Greens
|
|2.11%
|-
|style="background-color:"|
|align=left|Kristina Abramicheva
|align=left|Yabloko
|
|1.41%
|-
|style="background-color:"|
|align=left|Sania Timasova
|align=left|Party of Growth
|
|0.83%
|-
| colspan="5" style="background-color:#E9E9E9;"|
|- style="font-weight:bold"
| colspan="3" style="text-align:left;" | Total
| 
| 100%
|-
| colspan="5" style="background-color:#E9E9E9;"|
|- style="font-weight:bold"
| colspan="4" |Source:
|
|}

Notes

References 

Russian legislative constituencies
Politics of Bashkortostan